Hugo Miguel Almeida Costa Lopes (born 19 December 1986) is a Portuguese professional footballer who plays as a right-back for Estrela Amadora.

During his career, he played for each of the Big Three of Portuguese football – Benfica, Porto and Sporting CP – as well as spending time on loan in Spain and France. He competed five years in the Turkish Süper Lig with Akhisarspor and Kayserispor.

Lopes represented Portugal at Euro 2012.

Club career

Early career
Born in Lisbon, Lopes started his professional career with S.L. Benfica's B team. The following summer, he moved to the lower leagues with CD Operário.

After some solid displays, Lopes signed in the 2007–08 season with Segunda Liga's Rio Ave FC. In his first year, he was an habitual starter as the Vila do Conde side returned to the Primeira Liga after two years.

In 2008–09, Lopes helped Rio Ave to home draws against Benfica and FC Porto, and was again featured regularly, thus prompting interest from bigger clubs.

Porto
On 23 January 2009, Lopes agreed to a four-year deal with Porto which was made effective on 1 July. In his debut season, having to compete with Uruguayan Jorge Fucile for a starting berth, he appeared sparingly in the league but did manage to play 19 official matches, 14 as a starter.

In late August 2010, deemed surplus to requirements by new Porto manager André Villas-Boas as practically all Portuguese players, Lopes moved to Spanish side Real Betis on a one-year loan deal. He passed his medical and was unveiled on 2 September, eventually appearing in exactly half of the Segunda División games during the campaign as the Andalusians returned to La Liga as champions after three years.

Lopes spent the first part of 2011–12 unregistered by Porto. In the January transfer window he was loaned to fellow league club S.C. Braga, going on to start in seven of his league appearances as it finished third and qualified to the UEFA Champions League for the second time in its history.

Lopes returned to Porto for the 2012–13 season. On 29 September he scored through a rare header, opening the score in an eventual 2–2 draw at former team Rio Ave.

Sporting CP
In January 2013, Lopes joined fellow Big Three side Sporting CP on a five-and-a-half-year contract, with Marat Izmailov moving in the opposite direction. On 7 July, he agreed to a one-year loan deal at Olympique Lyonnais in Ligue 1.

On 31 May 2015, Lopes was featured in the final of the Taça de Portugal against Braga, coming on as a substitute after the first-half dismissal of Cédric Soares. Although he was beaten by Rafa Silva who put the opposition 2–0 up, his side eventually won in a penalty shootout.

Lopes returned to Spain on 6 August 2015, joining Granada CF on a one-year loan deal.

Turkey
The following season, still owned by Sporting, Lopes signed with Akhisarspor in the Süper Lig. Subsequently, the move was made permanent.

On 10 May 2018, Lopes helped the club win their first professional trophy, the Turkish Cup. In the final, he scored once in the 3–2 win over Fenerbahçe SK.

Lopes joined Kayserispor of the same league in July 2019, on a two-year contract. When he returned home for injury treatment the following March, he was unable to get back into Turkey due to COVID-19 restrictions, and his place was taken by Bosnian new signing Zoran Kvržić.

Later career
Lopes returned to Portugal in December 2021 after six years away, with the 35-year-old signing with C.F. Estrela da Amadora who had just been promoted to the second tier.

International career
Due to his ability to play as both a right and a left back, Lopes was selected by Portugal coach Paulo Bento for his UEFA Euro 2012 squad. He earned his first cap on 2 June in a 1–3 friendly loss against Turkey in Lisbon, being an unused member in the finals in Poland and Ukraine.

Personal life
Lopes' twin brother, Nuno, was also a footballer and a right-back. Both came through exactly the same youth system setup, with the exception of Benfica.

Career statistics

Honours

Porto
Primeira Liga: 2012–13
Taça de Portugal: 2009–10
Supertaça Cândido de Oliveira: 2010, 2012

Betis
Segunda División: 2010–11

Sporting CP
Taça de Portugal: 2014–15

Akhisarspor
Turkish Cup: 2017–18
Turkish Super Cup: 2018

References

External links

1986 births
Living people
Portuguese twins
Twin sportspeople
Portuguese footballers
Footballers from Lisbon
Association football defenders
Primeira Liga players
Liga Portugal 2 players
Segunda Divisão players
S.L. Benfica B players
CD Operário players
Rio Ave F.C. players
FC Porto players
S.C. Braga players
Sporting CP footballers
Sporting CP B players
C.F. Estrela da Amadora players
La Liga players
Segunda División players
Real Betis players
Granada CF footballers
Ligue 1 players
Olympique Lyonnais players
Süper Lig players
Akhisarspor footballers
Kayserispor footballers
Portugal youth international footballers
Portugal under-21 international footballers
Portugal international footballers
UEFA Euro 2012 players
Portuguese expatriate footballers
Expatriate footballers in Spain
Expatriate footballers in France
Expatriate footballers in Turkey
Portuguese expatriate sportspeople in Spain
Portuguese expatriate sportspeople in France
Portuguese expatriate sportspeople in Turkey